Allocasuarina simulans is a species of Casuarinaceae (ironwood) native from Nabiac to Forster on the east coast of Australia. It is dioecious, rarely monoecious.

References

External links
  Occurrence data for Allocasuarina simulans from The Australasian Virtual Herbarium

simulans
Fagales of Australia
Flora of New South Wales
Trees of Australia
Dioecious plants